The South Sudan Basketball Federation (SSBF) is the national basketball federation of South Sudan. It operates the men's team, women's team and junior teams. The federation is a FIBA member since November 14, 2003 and is a founding member of the South Sudanese Olympic Committee. The headquarters are located at Juba.

The current president is Luol Deng since 2019.

References

External links 

 Official website

National members of FIBA Africa
Sports governing bodies in South Sudan